The Arroyo Seco AVA is an American Viticultural Area in Monterey County, California, southeast of Monterey Bay.  The appellation encompasses  in the valley adjacent to the Arroyo Seco Creek.  Because of its proximity to the Pacific Ocean, the area has a cool climate, and is best suited for those grape varieties that benefit from the cool afternoon breeze.  The area is known for its gravelly soil.

See also
California wine

References

External links

American Viticultural Areas
American Viticultural Areas of California
Geography of Monterey County, California
1983 establishments in California